The 1999 Special Olympics World Summer Games were held in Raleigh, Durham, and Chapel Hill in North Carolina, United States between June 26 and July 4, 1999.  The events in 19 sports were predominantly held on the campuses of North Carolina State University, the University of North Carolina at Chapel Hill, and North Carolina Central University.

The gymnastics venue opening ceremonies was held in the Raleigh Convention Center.

Events
 Aquatics (Chapel Hill)
 Track and field (Raleigh)
 Badminton (Durham)
 Basketball (Chapel Hill and Durham)
 Bocce (Pittsboro)
 Bowling (Raleigh)
 Cycling (Garner)
 Equestrian (Raleigh)
 Football / soccer (Raleigh)
 Golf (Durham and Cary)
 Gymnastics (Raleigh)
 Handball (Raleigh)
 Powerlifting (Raleigh)
 Roller skating (Raleigh)
 Sailing (Maryland coast)
 Softball (Raleigh)
 Table tennis (Chapel Hill)
 Tennis (Chapel Hill)
 Volleyball (Chapel Hill)
 Long jump (Luwis Mcarthar)
 Shooting (Jamshed Anjum Pakistan)

External links
 Special Olympics

Special Olympics
Special Olympics World Summer Games
Special Olympics World Summer Games
Chapel Hill-Carrboro, North Carolina
Sports competitions in Raleigh, North Carolina
20th century in Raleigh, North Carolina
Special Olympics World Summer Games
Special Olympics World Summer Games
Special Olympics World Summer Games
June 1999 sports events in the United States
July 1999 sports events in the United States